Renato Jorge Magalhães Dias Assunção, known as Renato (born 21 January 1973) is a Portuguese football coach and a former player.

He played 17 seasons and 372 games in the Primeira Liga for União de Leiria, Salgueiros, Sporting and Vitória de Setúbal.

Club career
He made his Primeira Liga debut for Salgueiros on 22 September 1991 as a half-time substitute in a 1–1 draw with Boavista.

References

1973 births
Footballers from Porto
Living people
Portuguese footballers
S.C. Salgueiros players
Primeira Liga players
Sporting CP footballers
Vitória F.C. players
U.D. Leiria players
Leixões S.C. players
Liga Portugal 2 players
Portuguese football managers
Association football defenders
Portugal under-21 international footballers